Mohamed Al Shamy  is an Egyptian footballer who plays for Egyptian Premier League side Ismaily SC as a forward.

Awards and honours

Zamalek SC

Egypt Cup (1): 2017–18

References

1996 births
Living people
People from Dakahlia Governorate
Egyptian footballers
Egyptian Premier League players
Association football forwards
ENPPI SC players
Al Masry SC players
Zamalek SC players